Verdel Amos Kolve (1934–2022) was an honorary fellow at St Edmund Hall, University of Oxford and a retired professor of English.

Verdel was born in Wisconsin in 1934 to Amos and Gunda Kolve. He had a younger sister, Lois. Kolve gained his first degree at the University of Wisconsin, following which he went to Oxford University as a Rhodes Scholar in 1955. He stayed on as a post graduate and was supervised by J. R. R. Tolkien.

In 1966 he published The Play Called Corpus Christi (London: Arnold) in which he looked at a range of mystery plays – drawn from the York Cycle, Chester Cycle, Towneley cycle and the misnamed "Coventry Cycle". In 1968 he was awarded a Guggenheim Fellowship.

References

1934 births
Living people
Academics of the University of Oxford
American Rhodes Scholars
Alumni of the University of Oxford
University of Wisconsin–Madison alumni
Writers from Wisconsin